Grin is the fifth studio album by the Swiss thrash metal band Coroner, released in 1993. It was the band's final album before their fourteen-year break up from 1996 to 2010, and to date, other than several new tracks on the 1995 compilation album Coroner, Grin remains the most recent studio album by the band. It is also the last Coroner album to feature drummer Marky Edelmann, who left the band in 2014.

Musical style
Grin is considered a major departure from Coroner's previous works, moving to much greater experimentation. It is more focused on the aspects of progressive and technical metal, as opposed to the traditional thrash metal template of its predecessors. The album also incorporates elements of alternative metal, groove metal and industrial metal, and retains some of the avant-garde influences from the band's previous albums No More Color (1989) and Mental Vortex (1991).

Reissues
After being out of print for many years, Noise/BMG reissued the album in 2018, remastered with additional photographs of the band and memorabilia.

Track listing

Personnel
Coroner
Ron Broder (as Ron Royce) – vocals, bass
Tommy Vetterli (as Tommy T. Baron) – guitars
Marky Edelmann (as Marquis Marky) – drums, spoken word on "Host", art direction

Additional musicians
Kent Smith – keyboards & synthesizer
Roger Dupont – programming on "The Lethargic Age" and the instrumentals
Tim Chatfield – didgeridoo on "Status: Still Thinking" and the instrumentals
Paul Degoyler  – additional vocals on "Grin (Nails Hurt)"
Bettina Klöti – additional vocals on "Host"

Production
Tom Morris – engineer, mixing
Gerhard Woelfe – engineer
Voco Faux–Pas – drum engineer
Mark Prator – assistant engineer
Eddy Schreyer – mastering
Istvan Vizner – art direction, photography
Martin Becker – photography
Peter Vahlefeld – graphics
Karl–U. Walterbach – executive producer

Notes
The film Aliens is sampled at the start of "Internal Conflicts". The voices are Bill Paxton and Colette Hiller.
Polish technical death metal band Sceptic covered the song "Paralyzed, Mesmerized" for their 2005 album Internal Complexity.

References

External links
 BNR Metal Pages' section on Coroner
 Fan page with detailed album information and lyrics

1993 albums
Coroner (band) albums
Progressive metal albums by Swiss artists
Noise Records albums